Laurie Mitchell (born Mickey Koren; July 14, 1928 – September 20, 2018) was an American actress and model. Mitchell was perhaps best known for her role as Queen Yllana, the ruler of Venus, in Edward Bernds's 1958 science-fiction film Queen of Outer Space.

Early life
Mitchell was born in Manhattan on July 14, 1928. Her parents were Samuel and Adele Koren. She began her career in The Bronx where she was a child model. Her family moved to Los Angeles when Mitchell was in her teens.

Career
In 1954, she made her acting debut as a hooker opposite Kirk Douglas in 20,000 Leagues Under the Sea. She also appeared on television for the first time in an installment of Ford Television Theatre. She garnered a degree of fame in her role alongside Zsa Zsa Gabor in the 1958 science-fiction film Queen of Outer Space.

Mitchell has co-starring roles in the feature films Calypso Joe (1957) and That Touch of Mink (1962). She can also be seen in episodes of various American television series produced in the 1950s and 1960s, such as the Adventures of Superman, 77 Sunset Strip, Wanted: Dead or Alive, Hawaiian Eye, Perry Mason, Bonanza, The Alfred Hitchcock Hour, The Addams Family, and The Virginian.

Personal life and death
In 1949, aged 21, Mitchell married magician Larry White. They had two children and divorced in 1976. Mitchell later remarried and had two stepsons. She died of natural causes in 2018, at age 90, in Perris, California.

Filmography

References

External links
 
 Laurie Mitchell at Find a Grave

1928 births
2018 deaths
American film actresses
American television actresses
American female models
Actresses from New York City
Burials at Mount Sinai Memorial Park Cemetery
21st-century American women